Frank Möller (born 16 February 1960) is a retired East German sprinter.

He finished fourth in the 4 × 400 metres relay at the 1988 Olympic Games, with teammates Jens Carlowitz, Mathias Schersing and Thomas Schönlebe.

References

1960 births
Living people
German male sprinters
Athletes (track and field) at the 1988 Summer Olympics
Olympic athletes of East Germany
German athletics coaches